The Q-music Sessions is a special Within Temptation cover album in which consists of eleven covers made by the band for Qmusic (Netherlands) and Qmusic (Belgium) in celebration of their fifteenth anniversary. Due to the positive reactions from fans and the radio audience, the band decided to release a special album containing eleven of the fifteen covers made. In June 2021, The Q-music Sessions was released worldwide on all streaming platforms.

Background
In the run up to the 15th anniversary of Within Temptation, the band was asked by Q-Music to choose and perform an existing track in a "Within Temptation style" once a week during fifteen weeks during their special program Within Temptation Friday. The covers consist most part of pop songs in which the band transformed into a more symphonic oriented form. Lead vocalist Sharon den Adel stated that: “Our approach was to really make the cover a new Within Temptation song. So not going the easy way by using only a piano or an acoustic guitar for example, but really trying to put all the elements of a Within Temptation track in this new version. It was quite a challenge because we had only one week to get it right, while recording an original Within Temptation song can sometimes takes up half a year! But this pressure also gave us an creative boost and it was very rewarding to get it done in time each week. Also, we learned a lot from the in-depth analysis we needed to make on these hits, written by others, in combination with implementing our own sound and style in each new cover. We are glad that we’ve taken up this challenge and are very proud of the result.". They covered artists such as Imagine Dragons, OneRepublic, Lana Del Rey, The Who among others.

Missing songs
The band also did four more covers for the radio station, "Little Lion Man" (Mumford & Sons), "Somebody That I Used to Know" (Gotye), "Skyfall" (Adele) and "Paradise" (Coldplay), but the songs were not included on the album due to copyright issues from the original artists.

Track listing

Charts

Weekly charts

Year-end charts

References

Within Temptation albums
2013 albums
Covers albums
BMG Rights Management albums